Erick Odali Paniagua Japa (born 6 April 1999), known as Erick Japa, is a Dominican professional footballer who plays as a forward for Ecuadorian Serie B club CD Independiente Juniors and the Dominican Republic national team.

International career
Japa made his debut for Dominican Republic on 22 March 2018, being a second half substitute in a 4–0 friendly win against Turks and Caicos Islands.

References

External links

1999 births
Living people
People from San Cristóbal, Dominican Republic
Dominican Republic footballers
Association football wingers
Association football forwards
Liga Dominicana de Fútbol players
Liga Panameña de Fútbol players
Dominican Republic international footballers
Dominican Republic under-20 international footballers
Dominican Republic expatriate footballers
Dominican Republic expatriate sportspeople in Panama
Expatriate footballers in Panama
CA San Cristóbal players